Kniphofia  is a genus of perennial flowering plants in the family Asphodelaceae, first described as a genus in 1794. Species are native to Africa. Common names include tritoma, red hot poker, torch lily and poker plant.

Description
All plants produce spikes of upright, brightly coloured flowers well above the foliage, in shades of red, orange and yellow, often bicoloured. The flowers produce copious nectar while blooming and are attractive to bees and sunbirds. In the New World, they may attract nectarivores such as hummingbirds and New World orioles.

Etymology
The genus Kniphofia is named after Johann Hieronymus Kniphof, an 18th-century German physician and botanist.

Species
There are about 73 described species, including two hybrids.
 Kniphofia acraea Codd - Cape Provinces of South Africa
 Kniphofia albescens Codd - Mpumalanga, KwaZulu-Natal
 Kniphofia albomontana Baijnath - Lesotho, South Africa
 Kniphofia angustifolia (Baker) Codd - KwaZulu-Natal
 Kniphofia ankaratrensis Baker - Madagascar
 Kniphofia baurii Baker - KwaZulu-Natal, Cape Provinces
 Kniphofia benguellensis Welw. ex Baker - Angola, Zambia
 Kniphofia bequaertii De Wild. - Zaire, Tanzania, Burundi, Rwanda, Uganda
 Kniphofia brachystachya (Zahlbr.) Codd - Lesotho, KwaZulu-Natal, Cape Provinces
 Kniphofia breviflora Harv. ex Baker - KwaZulu-Natal, Free State
 Kniphofia bruceae (Codd) Codd - Cape Province
 Kniphofia buchananii Baker - KwaZulu-Natal
 Kniphofia caulescens Baker - Lesotho, KwaZulu-Natal, Cape Province, Free State
 Kniphofia citrina Baker - Cape Province
 Kniphofia coddiana Cufod. - KwaZulu-Natal, Cape Province
 Kniphofia coralligemma E.A.Bruce - Limpopo
 Kniphofia crassifolia Baker - Limpopo
 Kniphofia drepanophylla Baker - KwaZulu-Natal, Cape Provinces
 Kniphofia dubia De Wild - Zaire, Tanzania, Zambia, Angola
 Kniphofia ensifolia Baker - South Africa
 Kniphofia × erythraeae Fiori - Eritrea (K. pumila × K. schimperi)
 Kniphofia evansii Baker - KwaZulu-Natal
 Kniphofia fibrosa Baker - KwaZulu-Natal, Cape Provinces
 Kniphofia flammula Codd - KwaZulu-Natal
 Kniphofia fluviatilis Codd - South Africa
 Kniphofia foliosa Hochst. - Ethiopia
 Kniphofia galpinii Baker - KwaZulu-Natal, Eswatini, Mpumalanga
 Kniphofia goetzei Engl. - Tanzania
 Kniphofia gracilis Harv. ex Baker - KwaZulu-Natal, Cape Provinces
 Kniphofia grantii Baker - Zaire, Tanzania, Zambia, Rwanda, Burundi, Uganda, Malawi
 Kniphofia hildebrandtii Cufod. - Ethiopia
 Kniphofia hirsuta Codd - Lesotho, Cape Provinces
 Kniphofia ichopensis Schinz - KwaZulu-Natal
 Kniphofia insignis Rendle - Ethiopia
 Kniphofia isoetifolia Hochst. - Ethiopia
 Kniphofia latifolia Codd - KwaZulu-Natal
 Kniphofia laxiflora Kunth - KwaZulu-Natal, Cape Provinces
 Kniphofia leucocephala Baijnath - KwaZulu-Natal
 Kniphofia linearifolia Baker - Malawi, Mozambique, Zimbabwe, Lesotho, Eswatini, South Africa
 Kniphofia littoralis Codd - KwaZulu-Natal
 Kniphofia marungensis Lisowski & Wiland - Zaire
 Kniphofia mulanjeana S.Blackmore - Mt. Mulanje in Malawi
 Kniphofia multiflora J.M.Wood & M.S.Evans - Eswatini, South Africa
 Kniphofia nana Marais - Zaire
 Kniphofia northiae Baker - KwaZulu-Natal, Cape Provinces
 Kniphofia nubigena Mildbr. - Sudan
 Kniphofia pallidiflora Baker - Massif de l' Ankaratra in Madagascar
 Kniphofia paludosa Engl - Elton Plateau in Tanzania
 Kniphofia parviflora Kunth - KwaZulu-Natal, Cape Provinces
 Kniphofia pauciflora Baker - KwaZulu-Natal
 Kniphofia porphyrantha Baker - Lesotho, Eswatini, South Africa
 Kniphofia × praecox Baker - Cape Provinces (K. bruceae × K. uvaria)
 Kniphofia princeae (A.Berger) Marais - Zaire, Tanzania, Uganda, Rwanda, Malawi
 Kniphofia pumila (Aiton) Kunth - Zaire, Kenya, Uganda, South Sudan, Ethiopia, Eritrea
 Kniphofia reflexa Hutch. ex Codd - Nigeria, Cameroon (endangered)
 Kniphofia reynoldsii Codd - Tanzania, Zambia
 Kniphofia rigidifolia E.A.Bruce - Mpumalanga
 Kniphofia ritualis Codd - Free State, Lesotho, KwaZulu-Natal
 Kniphofia rooperi (T.Moore) Lem. - KwaZulu-Natal, Cape Provinces
 Kniphofia sarmentosa (Andrews) Kunth - Cape Provinces
 Kniphofia schimperi Baker - Ethiopia, Eritrea
 Kniphofia splendida E.A.Bruce - Malawi, Mozambique, Zimbabwe, northeastern South Africa, Eswatini
 Kniphofia stricta Codd - Cape Provinces, Lesotho
 Kniphofia sumarae Deflers - Ibb Mountains of Yemen
 Kniphofia tabularis Marloth - Cape Provinces
 Kniphofia thodei Baker - Lesotho, KwaZulu-Natal
 Kniphofia thomsonii Baker - Zaire, Kenya, Uganda, Tanzania, Ethiopia
 Kniphofia triangularis Kunth - Lesotho, South Africa
 Kniphofia typhoides Codd - Limpopo, KwaZulu-Natal, Free State, Mpumalanga
 Kniphofia tysonii Baker - KwaZulu-Natal, Cape Provinces, Eswatini
 Kniphofia umbrina Codd - Eswatini
 Kniphofia uvaria (L.) Oken - Cape Provinces; naturalized in Mexico, North Carolina, Spain, Oregon, Turkey, Washington State, St. Helena, California
 Kniphofia vandeweghei Fischer & Ackermann - Rwanda

Cultivation
Several species of Kniphofia are cultivated as garden plants, valued for their architectural properties. These include K. galpini, K. northiae, K. rooperi and K. thomsonii.

In addition to the species, many named cultivars of mixed or uncertain parentage have been selected for garden use. The following have gained the Royal Horticultural Society's Award of Garden Merit:- 
 
'Barton Fever'  (orange-white, 100 cm)
'Bees' Sunset'  (yellow, 90 cm)
'Brimstone'  (sulphur yellow, 90 cm)
'Buttercup'  (clear yellow, 75 cm)
'Coral Flame'  (coral red, 90 cm)
'Fiery Fred'  (orange, 130 cm)
'Incandesce'  (orange, 140 cm)
'Innocence'  (red-yellow, 110 cm)
'Jonathan'  (red-orange, 130 cm)
'Moonstone'  (yellow, 120 cm)
'Nobilis'  (evergreen, orange and yellow, 150 cm+)
'Penny Rockets'  (orange, 100 cm)
'Primrose Upward'  (yellow, 115 cm)
'Rich Echoes'  (orange-yellow, 120 cm)
'Royal Standard'  (red and yellow, 90 cm)
'Safranvogel'  (peach pink, 80 cm)
'Samuel's Sensation'  (red-yellow, 150 cm)
'Sunningdale Yellow'  (orange and yellow, 60 cm)
'Tawny King'  (cream/brown, 120 cm)
'Timothy'  (orange, 100 cm)
'Toffee Nosed'  (cream/brown, 100 cm)
'Wrexham Buttercup'  (yellow, 120 cm)

Gallery

See also

 List of plants known as lily

References

External links
 
 

 
Asphodelaceae genera